Spiridion Lusi (c. 1741 – c. 1815) was a Greek scholar, diplomat, politician and naturalized ambassador of Prussia.

Biography 
Spiridion Lusi was of Greek origin. He was born on the island of Cephalonia in 1741, at that time a possession of the Republic of Venice. He migrated to Italy where he resided for many years and was educated in the Greek College at Venice, and later at the University of Padua. He was eventually sent as Venice's minister to London, and in Prussia and Berlin. From 1763 to 1765, he translated the four volumes of a translation of Lucian from the Greek language into Italian, in four volumes published in London and Venice in 1764. Lusi added some dialogue translated by Gasparo Gozzi. Several years later he moved to Vienna.

In 1775, whilst Lusi was in Breslau, he made the acquaintance of Frederick the Great. He came to Berlin in 1777, where he was introduced into society and presented to the king at Potsdam. During the War of the Bavarian Succession, he joined the volunteer corps as a Captain, fought with distinction against the Austrians and was soon promoted to Major. In 1780 he was hired as Prussian ambassador to London, a position he assumed in February 1781. With the improvement of Prussia's relations with England, which occurred in the last years of Frederick's reign, Lusi managed to exert a more fruitful ambassadorial activity. In 1784 he was appointed Colonel. He was recalled in October 1788 from London, and in 1790 he accompanied the new king, Frederick William II, who contracted an army against Austria. In January 1792 he had a son, Friedrich Wilhelm Ludwig August Spiridion (Φρειδερίκος Λούζης), who would eventually become captain in the Guards Regiment. In 1792 he was appointed Major General by King Frederick William III, and Lieutenant General in 1798. In 1800 he was appointed ambassador at St. Petersburg, but he was dismissed two years later at his own request. Thereafter he lived quietly and withdrawn in Potsdam, where he died in 1815.

His descendants settled both in Germany and in Ireland. The name died out in Ireland in 1919 with the death of his granddaughter Countess Elise de Lusi, but his other Irish descendants include the physicist Professor John Joly FRS (1857–1933). In Germany still are living descendants.

References

1741 births
1815 deaths
People from Cephalonia
18th-century Greek people
19th-century Greek people
Lieutenant generals of Prussia
Prussian diplomats
18th-century Prussian people
German people of Greek descent
Republic of Venice diplomats
Ambassadors of Prussia
Translators to Italian
Translators from Greek
18th-century diplomats
University of Padua alumni
Greek emigrants to Italy
Greek emigrants to Germany
18th-century translators